Daal Baati is an Indian dish of daal (lentils) and baati (hard wheat rolls). It is popular in  Madhya Pradesh (especially in Braj, Nimar and Malwa regions), Rajasthan, Maharashtra’s Khandesh and Vidarbha region, Gujarat, and Uttar Pradesh.

Daal is prepared using tuvaar dal, chana daal (prepared by removing skin of split chickpeas), mung dal, moth dal, or urad dal. The pulses or lentils are cooked together after being soaked in water for a few hours. First, a small amount of vegetable oil is heated in a frying pan and then the seasoning rai-jeera (mustard and cumin seeds) is added into the hot oil. Then green chilli, garlic and some spices including asafoetida, red chilli, turmeric, coriander, ginger are added. There may be a sweet and sour version of dal in some regions. Finally, the boiled daal is added and cooked.

Baati is a hard bread made up of wheat flour commonly known as aata. Wheat flour is kneaded with little bit of salt, dahi (yogurt) and water. Tennis ball-sized round balls of this dough are cooked in a well-heated traditional oven or in an earthen stove. When the Baati  becomes golden brown in colour, it is greased with ghee and is then served with daal, rava laddoo, rice, pudina chutney, kairi (raw mango) chutney, garlic chutney, green salad with  much onion, and fresh buttermilk.

Dal Baati Choorma  
'Dal Baati Choorma' is a traditional delicacy from the state of Rajasthan. It is associated with the festivals of Makar Sankranti and Diwali in the Dhundhand region. It is also prepared on special occasions like marriage ceremonies and housewarming.

Dal Baati is eaten with Choorma popularly in regions of Rajasthan and Haryana. Choorma is a sweet delicacy made of coarsely grounded wheat flour, bajra (millet) flour, or semolina. It is made by grinding the fire-baked or fried dough balls and mixing it with ghee, powdered sugar, and dry fruits.

History 
This rustic sphere of baked deliciousness is revered as much for its simplicity as for its unforgettable taste. And yet when it comes to tracing the story behind this culinary masterpiece, there is not much available. People in the western region of India, i.e., Rajasthan, Haryana, and parts of Gujarat have been eating this for generations now.

Baati made of unsalted wheat, ghee and camel milk was first mentioned during the time of Bappa Rawal—the founder of the kingdom of Mewar in Rajasthan. They were known as a nomadic warrior tribe before they settled into the tapestry of a kingdom and got Chittor in form of dowry from Maan Mori, Baati was the Guhilot's official wartime meal.

It is said that soldiers would break the dough into chunks and leave it buried under thin layers of sand to bake under the sun. So when they returned, they could find perfectly baked roundels that were dunked into ghee and had; on a good day, there would be curd or buttermilk as well. Baati was paired with ghee and curd before Dal and Choorma. Choorma and the Panchmael Dal came as a later addition with time as civilization set in. 

And though a few anthropologists believe that at the grassroots level, Baati was still paired with ghee and buttermilk or curd made of camel or goat milk. It was the upper caste who enjoyed the combination of Dal and Baati. This can be connected to the result of traders settling in Mewar, or the influence of the Gupta period cooking style where Panchmael Dal was considered a delicacy and was eventually adopted by a royal chef and became popular.

The inclusion of Choorma, which is an integral part of the meal today, was yet another innovation that is credited to the House of Mewar. Folklore says that it was during one of the war days when a cook accidentally poured sugarcane juice into the Baati that the Choorma was found. Other tales tell of homemakers who would keep the Baatis in sugar/jaggery water in an attempt to keep the Baatis fresh for their husbands which eventually became Choorma. Perhaps this answers the association of Choorma with Dal Baati.

Dal bafla
Dal bafla is a variation of Dal Baati, where the normal Bafla is boiled before baking it in traditional Baati oven. Baati is replaced by the bafla, a softer version of it. it is native to Indore (Malwa region) of Madhya Pradesh. Although, parts of Rajasthan have been consuming Bafla and claims it to be native to the place.

References

External links
 

Indian legume dishes
Culture of Malwa
Lentil dishes
Rajasthani cuisine